John Armato (born June 13, 1948) is an American Democratic Party politician who represented the 2nd Legislative District in the New Jersey General Assembly from 2018 to 2022. He replaced Chris A. Brown, who relinquished his seat to run successfully for a seat in the New Jersey Senate.

Early life 
A life-long resident of Buena Vista, Armato graduated from Vineland High School in 1966 and served in the United States Air Force from 1967 to 1971. He has worked as an HVAC mechanic. Before being elected to the Assembly, Armato served for three years on the Township Committee of Buena Vista Township.

New Jersey Assembly 
With Republican Party Chris A. Brown leaving the Assembly to run for New Jersey State Senate in the November 2017 general election, Armato (with 25,683 votes; 26.6%) and his running mate, incumbent Vince Mazzeo (with 27,601; 28.6%), defeated Republican challengers Vince Sera (20,814; 21.5%) and Brenda Taube (20,611; 21.3%) to win both Assembly seats from the district for the Democrats. Armato serves in the Assembly on the Commerce and Economic Development Committee; the Health and Senior Services Committee; and the Military and Veterans' Affairs Committee. Armato has said he doesn't plan on challenging Senator Chris A. Brown in 2021.

During his tenure in the legislature, Armato has introduced legislation on behalf of first responders and disabled veterans. He introduced a legislative constitutional amendment, ACR48, which would amend the Constitution to give a total property tax exemption to honorably discharged permanently and totally disabled peacetime veterans. Another bill he introduced, A2692, would allow local governments like cities to create restricted parking spaces for certain volunteer firefighters.

To help combat the opioid epidemic, Armato introduced legislation, A3869, that requires doctors and other prescribers to prescribe opioid overdose medication to any patient who is at risk for opioid overdose.

In 2019, Armato was reelected by less than expected, winning a second term by 989 votes.

Committees 
Commerce and Economic Development
Health and Senior Services
Military and Veterans' Affairs

Electoral history

Assembly

References

1948 births
Living people
New Jersey city council members
Democratic Party members of the New Jersey General Assembly
Politicians from Atlantic County, New Jersey
United States Air Force airmen
Vineland High School alumni
21st-century American politicians